Funa fourlinniei is a species of sea snail, a marine gastropod mollusk in the family Pseudomelatomidae, the turrids and allies.

Description
The length of the shell attains 16 mm.

Distribution
This marine species occurs off Madagascar.

References

 Bozzetti, L., 2007. Funa fourlinniei (Gastropoda: Hypsogastropoda: Turridae) nuova specie dal Madagascar meridionale.. Malacologia Mostra Mondiale 54: 13

fourlinniei
Gastropods described in 2007